The ant thrushes are medium-sized insectivorous birds in the genus Neocossyphus of the thrush family Turdidae. These are African forest dwelling species. The genus Stizorhina is sometimes placed here.

Species
The following species are currently recognized:

 White-tailed ant thrush, Neocossyphus poensis (Strickland, 1844)
Red-tailed ant thrush, Neocossyphus rufus (Fischer & Reichenow, 1884)

References

External links

 
 
Taxa named by Gustav Fischer